Fundación Paraguaya is a leading edge self-sufficient social enterprise founded in Paraguay in 1985 that seeks to develop innovative solutions to poverty and unemployment, and proactively disseminate them throughout the world.

About

The Foundation enables people of limited resources to create jobs and increase their family income, promoting urban and rural entrepreneurship through four interrelated strategies: 
 A Microfinance program that supports microentrepreneurs and emerging entrepreneurs generally relegated by other microfinance institutions.
 An economic education program for children and young people (Junior Achievement).
 A self-sufficient agricultural high school that teaches organic agriculture and business skills to low income youth from rural areas to transform them from “poor small landholders” into “rural entrepreneurs”.
 An international replication program for self-sufficient schools alongside its UK sister organization Teach A Man To Fish.

Recognition

Fundación Paraguaya has received a number of awards, grants, and distinctions including the Skoll Award for Social Entrepreneurship. In 2018 the organization was awards the Juscelino Kubitschek Visionaries Award by the Inter American Development Bank.

History

Fundación Paraguaya was founded by social entrepreneur Martin Burt in 1985 during the  Stroessner dictatorship. They were the first microfinance institution in Paraguay, as well as a founding member of the Acción International microfinance network. They later adapted the Junior Achievement program's methodologies to serve underprivileged youth and teach them financial literacy. In 2003 the foundation took over a bankrupt boys' agricultural school, turning it into a financially self-sufficient school providing coed agricultural education. In 2009 they added a girls' school, and two more schools joined the educational model by 2011. They have committed to replicate the model in 50 schools globally.

References

External links
Official Site
Teach A Man To Fish

Foundations based in Paraguay
Microfinance organizations
Educational foundations